Ravenswood School for Girls (often referred to as Ravenswood or Ravo) is an independent, Uniting Church, day and boarding school for Prep - Year 12 girls, situated in Gordon, an Upper North Shore suburb of Sydney, New South Wales, Australia.

Established in 1901 by Mabel Fidler (1871–1960), Ravenswood currently caters for approximately 1100 students from Prep to Year 12, including 20 boarders from Years 10 to 12. The school has been an IB World School since June 2004, and is authorised to offer the IB Diploma Programme.

Ravenswood is affiliated with the Association of Heads of Independent Schools of Australia (AHISA), the Independent Primary School Heads of Australia (IPSHA), the Australian Boarding Schools' Association, the Alliance of Girls' Schools Australasia, and is a member of the Association of Heads of Independent Girls' Schools (AHIGS).

History
Ravenswood was established with eight students on 28 January 1901 by the first Headmistress, Mabel Fidler, as a non-sectarian private day school for girls, with preparatory classes for boys. The first classes took place in a schoolroom erected on the block adjacent to Fidler's home, "Ravenswood", in Henry Street, Gordon. The school remains on this site.

Fidler retired from Ravenswood in 1925, a year after the school was purchased by the Methodist Ladies' College, Burwood, thus becoming a school of the Methodist Church. Subsequently, the school name was changed to Ravenswood Methodist Ladies' College. At this time, Ravenswood was the largest non-residential, private secondary school in Sydney, with an enrolment of 180, and was highly regarded for the quality of its teaching and its achievements in sport. Ravenswood became a day and boarding school in 1935, with the enrolment of the first two boarders.

The 1960s saw the introduction of the school anthem, Kindle the Flame and a fourth school House, all houses being named by the students after Royal Houses of Britain: Stuart, Tudor, Windsor and York. In 1977, as the Methodist, Presbyterian and Congregational churches came together to form the Uniting Church, the school name changed to the current Ravenswood School for Girls. The royal blue and gold uniform was also introduced at this time.
	
In 2015, the Head Girl of the school used her end-of-term speech to accuse the school of peddling an "unrealistic image of perfection", and providing some students with more opportunities than others because "schools are being run more and more like businesses, where everything becomes financially motivated, where more value is placed on those who provide good publicity or financial benefits." She also alleged that the school had attempted to censor her speech by requiring prior copies. Her parents later sued the Uniting Church, which runs the school, because of disciplinary action taken against their younger daughter.

Campus

Ravenswood is located on its original site, a single campus in suburban Gordon. The school has progressively expanded since 1901, with the acquisition of new properties and the upgrading of facilities.

The school grounds feature quadrangles and courtyards, a multi-purpose complex with heated swimming pool, gymnasium, a "Strength and Conditioning centre" and an Athletics Field. The Ravenswood Centenary Centre includes a Performing Arts theatre, music centre and exhibition areas. Junior School students are catered for within the Junior School centre with a Resource Centre, playground and play equipment area, adventure playground and Assembly Hall.

Curriculum 
In Years 11 and 12, students may choose to take either the Higher School Certificate (HSC) course or the International Baccalaureate Diploma Course (IB).

Co-curriculum

Debating
Ravenswood has a tradition of debating, and students are offered opportunities to participate at competitive or social levels. Ravenswood competes in three inter-school debating competitions: the Independent Schools Debating Association (ISDA), the Archdale Debating Competition and the Independent Primary School Heads of Australia (IPSHA). Girls may also participate in House debating.

Sport 
Primary School students may partake in competitive sport through the Ravenswood's membership of the Independent Primary Schools Association of Australia (IPSHA). These competitions are usually held on Saturday mornings and include sports such as: Softball, Tennis, Netball, Cricket, Hockey, and Soccer.  Secondary School students compete against 28 other similar type schools in the Independent Girls' Schools Sporting Association (IGSSA) competition. These competitions occur on Saturday mornings or in the form of carnivals and include sports such as: Softball, Swimming, Diving, Cricket, Tennis, Hockey, Soccer and Gymnastics. Students who perform well at IPSHA or IGSSA level may be invited to compete in NSW Combined Independent Schools' (CIS) competitions.

Community 
It has been nominated for an "Employer of Choice for Women" classification by the Equal Opportunity for Women in the Workplace Agency (EOWA).

Ravenswood Australian Women’s Art Prize

The Ravenswood Australian Women’s Art Prize is an initiative led by Ravenswood School for Girls, which aims to address the paucity of art prizes available for female artists in Australia. It has been run since 2017. It is an acquisitive prize,  offering the following prizes:
 Professional Artist Prize - $35,000 
 Emerging Artist Prize - $5,000 
 Indigenous Emerging Artist Prize - $5,000 
 People’s Choice Award - $2,000 (non-acquisitive)

Winners
Professional artist prize
2018: Angela Tiatia
2019: Joanna Braithwaite
2022: Lara Merrett

Principals

Notable alumnae 

Media, entertainment and the arts
 Julia Baird – journalist, author and host of The Drum
 Gretel Killeen – author and host of Big Brother
 Tammin Sursok – Dani from Home and Away and Jenna from Pretty Little Liars

Medicine and science
 Grace Cuthbert-Browne, MBE, doctor and Director of Maternal and Baby Welfare in the New South Wales Department of Public Health from 1937 to 1964

Politics, public service and the law
Juanita Nielsen – publisher, anti-development campaigner, heiress to the Mark Foy's retail fortune. Disappeared in mysterious circumstances (believed kidnapped and murdered) from Kings Cross, in 1975. Subject of films, Heatwave (1982) and The Killing of Angel Street (1981)
Catherine West – Labour Party politician
Jillian Broadbent – economist, company director, director of Sydney Dance Company

Sport 
Tiffany Thomas Kane, world record holding Paralympian

See also 
 List of non-government schools in New South Wales
 List of boarding schools

References

External links 
 Ravenswood School for Girls website

Girls' schools in New South Wales
Boarding schools in New South Wales
Educational institutions established in 1901
Uniting Church schools in Australia
Association of Heads of Independent Girls' Schools
Junior School Heads Association of Australia Member Schools
Private secondary schools in Sydney
Private primary schools in Sydney
International Baccalaureate schools in Australia
Buildings and structures awarded the Sir John Sulman Medal
Gordon, New South Wales
Alliance of Girls' Schools Australasia
1901 establishments in Australia